Eumetriochroa hiranoi is a moth of the family Gracillariidae. It is known from Japan (Honshū and the Ryukyu islands) and China (Jiangxi).

The wingspan is 4.6-6.1 mm. This species appears very similar to Eumetriochroa kalopanacis but can be distinguished by from the latter by differences in the genital structures.

The larvae feed on Styrax japonicus. They mine the leaves of their host plant. The mine is found on the upper side of the leaf. It is long linear, irregularly curved, and somewhat serpentine. The mining part is discoloured into white, semitransparent and without a dark line of frass. A pupal chamber is placed at the end of mines, ellipsoidal, with a strongly swollen lower side and a wrinkled upper side.

Eumetriochroa hiranoi was named in honour of Nagao Hirano.

References

Phyllocnistinae
Insects of Japan
Moths of Japan
Moths described in 1998